Gökçeağaç can refer to:

 Gökçeağaç, Susurluk
 Gökçeağaç, Uğurludağ
 Gökçeağaç, Yığılca